Manazo Kobayashi (小林愛三) is a Japanese kickboxer and Nak Muay. She is the current RISE and WPMF World Flyweight champion.

As of May 2021, Combat Press ranks her as the tenth best female kickboxer in the world.

Biography

Early career
Manazo was born in Tokyo on February 2, 1996. She practiced volleyball throughout middle school, she discovered kickboxing as she was attending a high school dedicated to sports career.

Manazo made her professional debut on December 6, 2016. She defeated Yuri Kano by unanimous decision at The Battle of Muaythai 10.

On February 7, 2016 Manazo made waves and gained recognition when she defeated Muay Thai phenom Phetjee Jaa Or.Meekun for her second professional fight.

Kobayashi's next two fights against Miki Kitamura and Hongkao Mor.Rachaptchonbun went to a decision, after which she notched a victory over Meiji Banpitunluanpitong. Her five fight undefeated streak earned her the chance to fight Pokeaw Sor-Por-Lor Udon for the inaugural MuayThaiOpen Flyweight title. She won the fight by a first round knockout.

Kobayashi fought with MuayThaiOpen once more at MuayThaiOpen 38, when she was scheduled to fight Midori Kato. She won the fight by unanimous decision.

KNOCK OUT
In May 2017, Kobayashi had her first fight with KNOCK OUT, being scheduled to fight Haru Tajima at Road To KNOCK OUT.1. The fight ended in a draw. Kobayashi fought at the next Road To KNOCK OUT event as well, being scheduled to face Union Akari. The fight once again ended in a draw.

Following these two draws, Kobayashi was scheduled to fight a rematch with Haru Tajima at ROAD TO KNOCK OUT vol.5. Kobayashi won the fight by unanimous decision.

Kobayashi won her next three fights against Baifaingan Klayasortorn, Kai Ting Chuang and Do Kyung Lee, after which she decided to participate in the 2018 SHOOT BOXING 2018 Girls S-cup tournament. Kobayashi was scheduled to fight Jleana Valentino in the quarterfinals. Valentino won the fight by decision.

She returned to KNOCK OUT to fight Miki Kitamura at KNOCK OUT 2018 OSAKA 2nd. Kobayashi won the fight by decision. In her next fight, Kobayashi fought Saya Ito, once against winning by decision. Kobayashi fought a rematch with Jleana Valentino at KNOCK OUT 2019 SPRING, beating Valentino by unanimous decision.

On November 17, 2019, Kobayashi was scheduled to fight Tananchanok Kaewsamrit for the WPMF World Flyweight title. Kobayashi beat Tananchanok by a split decision.

RISE
Kobayashi signed with RISE in 2020 and was set to make her debut against Willa Saklek at RISE 140. Sakled would later withdraw following a knee injury, and was replaced by MARI. Kobayashi won the fight by a dominant unanimous decision.

Kobayashi next fought KOKOZ at RISE GIRLS POWER 3, once again winning by unanimous decision. She extended her winning streak to a career best of six with a unanimous decision over Maki Goto.

RISE Flyweight title reign
Kobayashi was scheduled to fight the former J-GIRLS and WPMF Japan Bantamweight champion Madoka Jinnai at RISE 144, for the inaugural RISE Women's Flyweight title. However, Jinnai later withdrew due to an injury. RISE would  subsequently promote Kobayashi to regular champion status. Kobayashi was rescheduled to fight Suzuka Tabuchi in a non-title match. Tabuchi won the fight by a majority decision.

As Tabuchi beat Kobayashi in a non-title match, the two of them were immediately scheduled to fight a rematch with the title on the line. Kobayashi was more successful in the rematch, managing to defend her title through a unanimous decision victory.

Kobayashi was scheduled to fight the RISE Mini Flyweight champion Hinata Terayama, in a 49.5 kg catchweight bout, at RISE GIRLS POWER 5. She lost the fight by majority decision, with scores of 30-29, 30-29 and 29-29.

Kobayashi was scheduled to challenge the reigning Glory Women's Super Bantamweight champion Tiffany van Soest at Glory 80 on March 19, 2022. She lost the fight by a fifth-round technical knockout.

Kobayashi faced Do Kyung Lee in a rematch at RISE 160 on July 29, 2022. The non-title bout was a rematch of their April 14, 2018 meeting, which Kobayashi won by unanimous decision. She won the rematch by unanimous decision, as well, with all three judges scoring the bout 30-26 in her favor.

Kobayashi faced the Enfusion Women's Strawweight champion Tessa De Kom in a non-title bout at RISE WORLD SERIES / SHOOTBOXING-KINGS on December 25, 2022. She lost the fight by unanimous decision, with scores of 30-29, 29-28 and 29-28.

Kobayashi made her second RISE title defense against Tessa De Kom at RISE 168 on May 28, 2023.

Championships and accomplishments
RISE
 2020 RISE Queen -52 kg Champion
World Professional Muaythai Federation
 2019 WPMF World Flyweight Champion
MuayThaiOpen
2016 MuayThaiOpen Flyweight Champion

Fight record

|-  style="background:#;"
| 2023-05-28|| ||align=left| Tessa De Kom || RISE 168 || Tokyo, Japan ||   ||  ||
|-
! style=background:white colspan=9 |

|-  style="background:#fbb;"
| 2022-12-25|| Loss ||align=left| Tessa De Kom || RISE WORLD SERIES / Glory Rivals 4|| Tokyo, Japan || Decision (Unanimous) || 3 ||3:00
|-
|-  bgcolor="#cfc"
| 2022-07-29 || Win ||align=left| Do Kyung Lee || RISE 160 || Tokyo, Japan || Decision (Unanimous) || 3 || 3:00 
|-
|-  style="background:#fbb"
| 2022-03-19 || Loss ||align=left| Tiffany van Soest || Glory 80 || Hasselt, Belgium || TKO (Spinning back kick)|| 5 ||2:56
|-
! style=background:white colspan=9 |

|-  style="background:#fbb"
| 2021-09-12 || Loss || align=left| Hinata Terayama || RISE GIRLS POWER 5|| Tokyo, Japan || Decision (Majority) || 3 || 3:00
|-  bgcolor="#cfc"
| 2021-04-17|| Win||align=left| Suzuka Tabuchi || RISE 148 || Tokyo, Japan || Decision (Unanimous) || 5 || 3:00  
|-
! style=background:white colspan=9 |
|-  bgcolor="#fbb"
| 2020-12-18|| Loss ||align=left| Suzuka Tabuchi || RISE 144 || Tokyo, Japan || Decision (Majority) || 3 || 3:00
|-  style="background:#cfc;"
| 2020-10-29 || Win ||align=left| Maki Goto|| NO KICK NO LIFE ~Shin Shou~ Diamond FES || Tokyo, Japan || Decision (Unanimous)  || 3|| 3:00
|-  bgcolor="#cfc"
| 2020-09-20|| Win||align=left| KOKOZ || RISE GIRLS POWER 3 || Tokyo, Japan || Decision (Unanimous) || 3 || 3:00
|-  bgcolor="#cfc"
| 2020-07-19|| Win||align=left| MARI|| RISE 140|| Tokyo, Japan || Decision (Unanimous) || 3 || 3:00
|-  bgcolor="#cfc"
| 2019-11-17|| Win||align=left| Tananchanok Kaewsamrit|| JAPAN KICKBOXING INNOVATION 6|| Okayama, Japan || Decision (Split) || 5 || 2:00 
|-
! style=background:white colspan=9 |
|-  bgcolor="#cfc"
| 2019-04-29|| Win||align=left| Jleana Valentino || KNOCK OUT 2019 SPRING|| Tokyo, Japan || Decision (Unanimous) || 5 || 3:00
|-  bgcolor="#cfc"
| 2018-12-09|| Win||align=left| Saya Ito || KING OF KNOCK OUT 2018 || Tokyo, Japan || Decision (Unanimous) || 5 || 2:00
|-  bgcolor="#cfc"
| 2018-09-08|| Win||align=left| Miki Kitamura || KNOCK OUT 2018 OSAKA 2nd || Osaka, Japan || Decision (Unanimous) || 3 || 3:00
|-  bgcolor="#fbb"
| 2018-07-06|| Loss||align=left| Jleana Valentino || SHOOT BOXING 2018 Girls S-cup -48 kg World Tournament, Quarter Final|| Tokyo, Japan || Decision (Unanimous) || 3 || 3:00
|-  bgcolor="#cfc"
| 2018-04-14|| Win||align=left| Do Kyung Lee || KNOCK OUT Sakura Burst || Kawasaki, Japan || Decision (Unanimous) || 3 || 3:00
|-  bgcolor="#cfc"
| 2018-02-12|| Win||align=left| Kai Ting Chuang || KNOCK OUT FIRST IMPACT || Tokyo, Japan || Decision (Majority) || 5 || 3:00
|-  bgcolor="#cfc"
| 2017-11-26|| Win||align=left| Baifaingan Klayasortorn || MuayThaiOpen 40 || Tokyo, Japan || KO || 2 ||
|-  bgcolor="#cfc"
| 2017-10-04|| Win||align=left| Haru Tajima || ROAD TO KNOCK OUT vol.5	|| Tokyo, Japan || Decision (Unanimous) || 3 || 3:00
|-  bgcolor="#c5d2ea"
| 2017-07-20|| Draw||align=left| Union Akari || Road To KNOCK OUT.2|| Tokyo, Japan || Decision (Split) || 3 || 3:00
|-  bgcolor="#c5d2ea"
| 2017-05-10|| Draw||align=left| Haru Tajima|| Road To KNOCK OUT.1|| Tokyo, Japan || Decision (Split) || 3 || 3:00
|-  bgcolor="#cfc"
| 2017-04-02|| Win||align=left| Midori Kato || MuayThaiOpen 38 || Tokyo, Japan || Decision (Unanimous) || 3 || 2:00
|-  bgcolor="#cfc"
| 2016-12-25|| Win||align=left| Pokeaw Sor-Por-Lor Udon|| MuayThaiOpen 37|| Tokyo, Japan || KO (Knees) ||1 || 1:06 
|-
! style=background:white colspan=9 |
|-  bgcolor="#cfc"
| 2016-10-02|| Win||align=left| Meiji Banpitunluanpitong|| MuayThaiOpen 36|| Tokyo, Japan || KO (Spinning Elbow) ||2 || 1:11
|-  bgcolor="#c5d2ea"
| 2016-07-17|| Draw||align=left| Hongkao Mor.Rachaptchonbun|| MuayThaiOpen 35|| Tokyo, Japan || Decision (Unanimous) ||3 || 3:00
|-  bgcolor="#c5d2ea"
| 2016-05-29|| Draw||align=left| Miki Kitamura|| J-NETWORK J-FIGHT＆J-GIRLS 2016 2nd|| Tokyo, Japan || Decision (Majority) ||3 || 3:00
|-  bgcolor="#cfc"
| 2016-02-07|| Win||align=left| Phetjee Jaa Or.Meekun || MuayThaiOpen 34|| Tokyo, Japan || Decision (Majority) ||5 || 2:00
|-  bgcolor="#cfc"
| 2015-12-06|| Win||align=left| Yuri Kano || BOM The Battle of Muaythai 10 || Yokohama, Japan || Decision (Unanimous) ||3 || 2:00
|-
| colspan=9 | Legend:    

|-  style="background:#cfc;"
| 2015-08-02|| Win || align=left| Nana Okuwaki || Muay Thai Super Fight Amateur vol.2 - Suk Wan Kingtong|| Tokyo, Japan || Decision (Unanimous) || 2 || 2:00
|-  style="background:#cfc;"
| 2015-08-02|| Win || align=left| Akane Tamaru || Muay Thai Super Fight Amateur vol.2 - Suk Wan Kingtong|| Tokyo, Japan || Decision (Unanimous) || 2 || 2:00
|-  style="background:#fbb;"
| 2015-07-19|| Loss|| align=left| Miiri Sasaki || The Battle of Muay Thai Amateur 12 ||  Yokohama, Japan || Decision  || 2 || 1:30
|-  style="background:#cfc;"
| 2015-04-05|| Win|| align=left| Ayano Namegawa || The Battle of Muay Thai Amateur 10 || Tokyo, Japan || Decision  || 2 || 1:30 
|-
| colspan=9 | Legend:

See also
 List of female kickboxers

References 

Japanese kickboxers
1996 births
Living people
Japanese female kickboxers
Sportspeople from Tokyo
Bantamweight kickboxers